Rien is a 1994 album by the German krautrock group Faust. It was their fifth album, and their first reunion album.

Recording
The album was produced by Jim O'Rourke. It is not a coherent recording as none of the musicians actually played on it.

Critical reception
Trouser Press called the album "more a return to form than The Faust Concerts, with droning violins, pounding industrial synthesizers, odd sound effects, trumpet improvisations and, of course, power tools combining in an experimental haze."

Track listing
 "Rien" – 5.32	
 "Long Distance Calls in the Desert" – 4.09	
 "Eroberung der Stille: Teil II" – 6.54	
 "Listen to the Fish" – 15.24	
 "Eroberung der Stille: Teil I" – 9.19	
 "Fin" – 1.23

Personnel
Werner "Zappi" Diermaier –	drums
Jean-Hervé Péron – bass guitar
Keiji Haino – guitar	
Hans-Joachim Irmler – organ	
Steven Wray Lobdell – guitar	
Michael Morley – guitar
Erling Wold – various
Ferrara Brain Pan – Turkish pipe

References

External links
Rien at Faust Pages
Rien at Discogs

1994 albums
Faust (band) albums